Conicofrontia is a genus of moths of the family Noctuidae.

Species
 Conicofrontia dallolmoi Berio, 1973
 Conicofrontia diamesa (Hampson, 1920)
 Conicofrontia sesamoides Hampson, 1902

References
 Conicofrontia at Markku Savela's Lepidoptera and Some Other Life Forms
 Natural History Museum Lepidoptera genus database

Hadeninae